Carl Graf von Horn (16 February 1847 – 5 June 1923) was a Bavarian Colonel General and War Minister from 4 April 1905 to 16 February 1912. He was born in Würzburg and died in Munich.<ref
name="HdBG">Horn, Karl Graf von , House of the Bavarian history (HdBG).</ref> Before he became minister, he was Lieutenant General and divisional commander in Regensburg, where the Hornstraße is named in honor of him.

References and notes 

Bavarian Ministers of War
Bavarian generals
Military personnel from Würzburg
People from the Kingdom of Bavaria
1847 births
1923 deaths